Gandhi's Truth: On the Origins of Militant Nonviolence is a 1969 book about Mahatma Gandhi by the German-born American developmental psychologist Erik H. Erikson. It won the Pulitzer Prize for General Non-Fiction
and the U.S. National Book Award in category Philosophy and Religion.

The book was republished in 1993 by Norton.

References

External links

1969 non-fiction books
American non-fiction books
Books by Erik Erikson
English-language books
Books about Mahatma Gandhi
National Book Award-winning works
Pulitzer Prize for General Non-Fiction-winning works
W. W. Norton & Company books